Chengzhong (城中) may refer to the following locations in the PRC:

Chengzhong District, Liuzhou, Guangxi
Chengzhong District, Xining, Qinghai
Chengzhong, Ningming County, town in Guangxi
Subdistricts
Chengzhong Subdistrict, Sihui, Guangdong
Chengzhong Subdistrict, Liuzhou, in Chengzhong District, Liuzhou, Guangxi
Chengzhong Subdistrict, Wuzhou, in Wanxiu District, Wuzhou, Guangxi
Chengzhong Subdistrict, Yingcheng, in Yingcheng, Xiaogan, Hubei
Chengzhong Subdistrict, Huaihua, in Hecheng District, Huaihua, Hunan
Chengzhong Subdistrict, Taizhou, Jiangsu, in Hailing District, Taizhou, Jiangsu
Chengzhong Subdistrict, Jinhua, in Wucheng District, Jinhua, Zhejiang
Chengzhong Subdistrict, Yarkant County, Kashgar Prefecture, Xinjiang